James Creedon is a former Secretary of the Pennsylvania Department of General Services.

References

Living people
State cabinet secretaries of Pennsylvania
Year of birth missing (living people)
Place of birth missing (living people)